"This Is England" is a song by the English punk rock band the Clash, released as a single in September 1985, from their sixth and final studio album, Cut the Crap. Produced by Bernard Rhodes and co-written by Strummer and Rhodes, it was the band's last single, in their later incarnation of Joe Strummer, Paul Simonon, Nick Sheppard, Pete Howard and Vince White.

Composition
Written in late 1983, the song is about the state of England at the time. "This Is England" comprises a list of the problems in England during the early years of the Margaret Thatcher administration, addressing inner-city violence, urban alienation, life on council estates, high unemployment rate, England's dying motorcycle industry, racism, nationalism, and police corruption. Additionally, the song explores two very common subject matters for the mid-1980s left-wing songwriters: the wave of patriotism from the Falklands War and the consumerist, subservient mindset of many English people at the time. 

The lyrics are considered some of the strongest from Joe Strummer, which were overshadowed by the infamous negative reception of Cut the Crap. The song contains a drum machine and synthesizers, instruments which were mostly not utilized by The Clash during the Topper and Mick Jones era. The song begins with the squeaky voice of a market hawker shouting, "four for a pound your face flannels; three for a pound your tea towels!"

Release
The single was released on 7-inch vinyl, backed with "Do It Now", and on 12-inch vinyl format with a different cover and an additional track on side two, titled "Sex Mad Roar". Strummer described "This Is England" as his "last great Clash song".

Legacy
"This Is England" was included on The Essential Clash compilation in 2003. In 2006, the single was fully re-released on CD as disc 19 in Singles Box, accompanied by a faithful re-creation of the single's original artwork and the extra track "Sex Mad Roar" from the original 12-inch pressing. The single also appears on the 2007 collection The Singles. "This is England" is also the only song from Cut the Crap to ever appear on compilations.

Track listing
7" vinyl
 "This Is England" – 3:37
 "Do It Now" – 3:07

12" vinyl
 "This Is England" – 3:37
 "Do It Now" – 3:07
 "Sex Mad Roar" – 2:59

Personnel
Joe Strummer – lead vocals
Paul Simonon – bass guitar, backing vocals
Nick Sheppard – guitar, backing vocals
Vince White – guitars
Pete Howard – drums on "Do It Now" and "Sex Mad Roar"
Bernie Rhodes – synthesisers, backing vocals, drums, sound effects

Charts

References 

1985 singles
The Clash songs
Protest songs
Songs about England
1985 songs
Songs written by Joe Strummer
CBS Records singles
Songs written by Bernard Rhodes